Harry Leopold DeBaecke (June 9, 1879 – November 6, 1961) was an American rower who competed in the 1900 Summer Olympics.

He was born to Henry DeBaecke (1830-1910) and Octavia Slembrouck (1846-1889) in Philadelphia, Pennsylvania. He had an older sister named Annie. He was part of the American Vesper Boat Club, which won the gold medal in the eights at the 1900 Paris Olympics. At the time, he was 21 and the youngest member of the team. In 1903, he married Carolyn  May. He had two children: Harry and Cecelia. He died on November 6, 1961 in Philadelphia at the age of 82.

References

External links
 
 

1879 births
1961 deaths
Rowers from Philadelphia
Rowers at the 1900 Summer Olympics
Olympic gold medalists for the United States in rowing
American male rowers
Medalists at the 1900 Summer Olympics